In June 2014, Ireland played a two-test series against Argentina. This was Ireland's first test series against Argentina since 2007, in which Argentina won that series 2–0. However, Ireland did go into this series on the back of a Six Nations Championship victory, and three consecutive win over Argentina. Including a record winning margin of 22, the last time these two teams faced each other. The tour is part of the third year on the global rugby calendar established by the International Rugby Board, which runs through to 2019.

Ireland won the series 2–0, the first time they had won a test series in Argentina, and won the Admiral Brown Cup for the second time.

Fixtures

Squads
Note: Caps and ages are to 7 June, pre first test.

Ireland
On 19 May 2014, Ireland announced a 30-man squad for their 2014 tour of Argentina.

On 21 May 2014, Paddy Jackson was ruled out of the tour due to injury. He was replaced by Ian Madigan.

On 1 June 2014, Keith Earls and Martin Moore were ruled out of the tour due to injuries. Earls was replaced by Noel Reid, while Moore was replaced by Rodney Ah You. Both these replacements were promoted from the Emerging Ireland side that is participating in the 2014 IRB Nations Cup in Bucharest.

Head coach:  Joe Schmidt

Argentina
Argentina 33-man Squad for their June tests against Ireland and Scotland, plus the uncapped match against a South American XV side.

Head coach:  Daniel Hourcade

Matches

First Test

Second Test

Statistics
Key
Con: Conversions
Pen: Penalties
DG: Drop goals
Pts: Points

Tour statistics

Test series statistics

References

Ireland tour
Rugby union tours of Argentina
Ireland national rugby union team tours
Ireland tour
2013–14 in Irish rugby union